Mount Elphinstone Provincial Park is located on LARGO Rd in Roberts Creek British Columbia, Canada. NO park access off of Crowe Rd. Located near Mount Elphinstone, the park is on the west side of Howe Sound and north of the town of Gibsons and near the community of Roberts Creek.  Created in 2000, the park is approximately 141 hectares in size. Dogs must be on leash.

See also
List of British Columbia provincial parks

References

External links
 Mount Elphinstone hiking route description

Provincial parks of British Columbia
Sunshine Coast (British Columbia)
Pacific Ranges
Elphinstone
2000 establishments in British Columbia
Protected areas established in 2000